Tianjin Lifei F.C. (天津立飞足球俱乐部) is a defunct Chinese football club based in Tianjin, China.

History
The club was founded on 20 January 2000. They participated in the 2000 China League Two and won instant promotion to Jia B after beating Guangzhou Baiyunshan on penalties in the semi-finals. However, after only one season, they sold their entire squad as well as their place in the second-tier to Gansu Tianma and was dissolved afterwards.

Results
All-time League Rankings

References

Defunct football clubs in China
Football clubs in China
Association football clubs established in 2000
Association football clubs disestablished in 2001
2000 establishments in China
2001 disestablishments in China